Werner Streib (13 June 1911 – 15 June 1986) was a German Luftwaffe military aviator during World War II, a night fighter ace credited with 68—one daytime and 67 nighttime—enemy aircraft shot down in about 150 combat missions. All of his nocturnal victories were claimed over the Western Front in Defense of the Reich missions against the Royal Air Force's Bomber Command.

Born in Pforzheim, Streib grew up in the Weimar Republic and Third Reich. Following graduation from school, he began military service in the Reichswehr in 1934 and in 1936, transferred to the Luftwaffe. After training at various postings, he served with Zerstörergeschwader 1 (ZG 1—1st Destroyer Wing) flying a Messerschmitt Bf 110 heavy fighter at the outbreak of World War II. On 10 May 1940, Streib claimed his first aerial victory. In June 1940, he was appointed Staffelkapitän (squadron leader) of the 2. Staffel (2nd squadron) of ZG 1. Shortly later, this squadron became 2. Staffel of Nachtjagdgeschwader 1 (NJG 1—1st Night Fighter Wing). On the night of 19/20 July, Streib claimed his first nocturnal aerial victory. In October 1940, he was appointed Gruppenkommandeur (group commander) of the I. Gruppe of NJG 1 and by end-1940 was credited with nine aerial victories. In 1943, Streib was involved in evaluating the then new Heinkel He 219. Flying the He 219, he claimed five aircraft destroyed on 11/12 June 1943. Streib was appointed Geschwaderkommodore (wing commander) of NJG 1 on 1 July 1943. On 11 March 1944, he was awarded the Knight's Cross of the Iron Cross with Oak Leaves and Swords, the highest award in the military and paramilitary forces of Nazi Germany during World War II, for 66 confirmed victories. In March 1944, he was made Inspector of Night Fighters and he would stay in this post until the end of the war.

Early life
Streib, the son of a merchant, was born on 13 June 1911 in Pforzheim, at the time located in the Grand Duchy of Baden of the German Empire. Following graduation from school with his Abitur (university-preparatory high school diploma) and a commercial education in 1934, Streib joined the military service in the Reichswehr with Infanterie-Regiment 14, a regiment of the 5. Infanterie-Division based in Konstanz, as a Fahnenjunker (officer cadet). On 1 October 1935, then an Oberfähnrich (officer candidate), Streib transferred to the newly emerging Luftwaffe (air force) and was promoted to Leutnant (second lieutenant) on 1 April 1936. Streib first served as an air observer with an aerial reconnaissance unit before in 1938, he was posted to the II. Gruppe (2nd group) of Jagdgeschwader 132 "Richthofen", named after the World War I fighter ace Manfred von Richthofen. This unit was later renamed to I. Gruppe (1st group) of Zerstörergeschwader 1 (ZG 1—1st Destroyer Wing).

World War II
On Friday 1 September 1939, German forces invaded Poland starting World War II in Europe. At the time, Streib was serving with the Flughafenbetriebskompanie (airport operational company) of I./ZG 1 before becoming a pilot. On 10 May 1940, the first day of the Battle of France, Streib claimed his first aerial victory. Flying a Messerschmitt Bf 110 heavy fighter, he was credited with shooting down a Royal Air Force (RAF) Bristol Blenheim bomber. For this achievement he was awarded the Iron Cross 2nd Class on 17 May 1940. On 6 June 1940, he was appointed Staffelkapitän (squadron leader) of the 2. Staffel (2nd squadron) of ZG 1. This squadron became 2. Staffel of Nachtjagdgeschwader 1 (NJG 1—1st Night Fighter Wing) on 26 June 1940.

Night fighter career
In May 1940 the creation of the Nachtjagd (night fighter force) had commenced and I. Gruppe of NJG 1 flew out of Gütersloh airfield. On the night of 19/20 July, Streib claimed his first nocturnal aerial victory over a RAF Armstrong Whitworth Whitley shot down at 02:15 near Saerbeck. On 30/31 August 1940, Streib claimed two aerial victories. He was credited with shooting down a Vickers Wellington at 23:24 north-northeast of Emmerich am Rhein and a Handley Page Hampden at 00:32 near Arnhem. On the night of 30 September to 1 October, Streib was victorious over two Wellington and one Hampden bombers. He claimed the first Wellington at 22:49 near Bersenbruck and the second at 23:35 near Menslage. The Hampden was shot down at 23:19 near Badbergen. This took his total to eight victories in overall, including seven by night and one by day. He was also awarded the Knight's Cross of the Iron Cross on 6 October 1940 as Oberleutnant (first lieutenant) and Staffelkapitän of the 2./NJG 1. After Wolfgang Falck, Streib was the second member of the night fighter force and first pilot to receive this distinction. On 7 October, he was promoted to Hauptmann (captain) and appointed Gruppenkommandeur (group commander) of the I. Gruppe of NJG 1.

On the night of 14/15 October, Streib was credited with the destruction of another Hampden at 03:05 northeast of Calbe, this was also his last of 1940 and ninth overall. For these achievements he received the German Cross in Gold, awarded on 26 February 1941. Four nights later, on 14/15 March 1941, a Wellington shot down at 22:32 near Helenaveen became his tenth, eleventh overall, aerial victory. On 10/11 April 1941, he was credited with shooting down a Hampden at 22:49 west of Roggel and a second Hampden at 23:02 near Ittervoort. One Whitley shot down on each night of 30 June to 1 July and 3/4 July 1941 respectively, took his total to 16 aerial victories overall. Two Wellingtons fell to his guns on the night of 15/16 July. The first aircraft was claimed at 00:54 near Someren and the second at 01:45 near Geyspers.

Kammhuber Line

By mid-1940 by Generalmajor (Brigadier General) Josef Kammhuber had established a night air defense system dubbed the Kammhuber Line. It consisted of a series of control sectors equipped with radars and searchlights and an associated night fighter. Each sector named a Himmelbett (canopy bed) would direct the night fighter into visual range with target bombers. Streib claimed his 20th nocturnal victory on the night of 16/17 August. On the night of 27/28 December, Streib claimed his last victories of 1941 taking his total to 23, including one daytime victory. At 20:15 and at 20:45, he claimed a Wellington and a Whitley, both over the Zuiderzee.

Two Wellington's claimed on 26/27 March 1942, were his first on 1942. The first Wellington was shot down at 23:51 in the vicinity of Enkhuizen and the second at 23:58 southeast of Zutphen. He again claimed two Wellington's two weeks later.

Streib claimed his last victory of 1942 on the night of 20/21 December. These two claims took his total to 45 aerial victories, including one by day. On 26 February 1943, Streib was awarded the Knight's Cross of the Iron Cross with Oak Leaves as Major and Gruppenkommandeur of the I./NJG 1. He was the 197th member of the German armed forces to be so honored. He received the Oak Leaves from Adolf Hitler personally at his office in the New Reich Chancellery in Berlin on 11 May 1943. During the night of the 29/30 March he shot down Wellington HE545 from No. 166 Squadron RAF. Pilot Officer James Robert Arthur Hodgson and his crew were posted missing. On the night of the 3/4 April 1943 Streib claimed a trio of Halifax bombers on an operation to attack Essen. One of the bombers was Halifax II DT723, LQ-F, crewed by Royal Canadian Air Force (RCAF) personnel from No. 504 Squadron RAF and piloted by Pilot Officer L. Lago. All the crew with the exception of Flight Sergeant W. S. Beaty survived to be taken prisoner of war.

Testing the Heinkel He 219
Streib was involved in evaluating the then new Heinkel He 219 for its suitability as night fighter. On 25 March 1943, Streib flew He 219 V1 in mock combat against a Junkers Ju 188 E-1, piloted by Oberst Viktor von Loßberg, at the Erprobungstelle Rechlin, the primary Luftwaffe aviation service-test facility, located just south of Rechlin. In this test the He 219 proved itself to be more than  faster than the Ju 188. The He 219 also easily outmaneuvered the Ju 188 in this test. The theoretically greater rate of climb of the Ju 188 proved to be incorrect.

On the night of 11/12 June 1943, Streib, together with radio operator (Bordfunker) Unteroffizier Helmut Fischer, flew the prototype version He 219 V9, with the pre-production label A-0/R2 "G9+FB" (Werknummer 190 009—factory number), in combat against the RAF and claimed five aerial victories. That night, Bomber Command had sent a force of 783 heavy bombers on an attack against Düsseldorf. Of this attack force, made up of Wellington, Handley Page Halifax, Short Stirling and Avro Lancaster bombers, 693 aircraft actually hit the target. This "ace-in-a-day" achievement took his total to 55 nocturnal aerial victories.

However, when returning to Venlo, Streib crashed the He 219 during landing. Low on fuel, Streib reported that during the landing approach the cockpit iced up, impairing his vision, necessitating an instrument approach. He activated the electrically controlled flaps and lowered the landing gear. Unnoticed by Streib, the flaps did not lock down and the electrically controlled flaps retracted themselves. Subsequently, his airspeed was too high during the final approach. Streib, misjudging his airspeed, flared the aircraft and slammed it into the runway. The resulting shockwave ruptured the tires; the starboard engine and cockpit were torn off the aircraft. Both Streib and Fischer escaped with minor injuries.

High command
On 24/25 June 1943, he was credited with a victory over Halifax claimed at 00:51 near Kempen. Streib was appointed Geschwaderkommodore (wing commander) of NJG 1 on 1 July 1943, succeeding Falck in this capacity. On the night of 25/26 July 1943, Streib claimed four aerial victories, the second of which his 60th nocturnal. One of the bombers was Halifax JA855, PM-A, from No. 103 Squadron RAF. Squadron leader G. R. Carpenter was captured but only three other members survived.

On 11 March 1944, he was awarded the Knight's Cross of the Iron Cross with Oak Leaves and Swords for 66 confirmed victories. The presentation was made by Hitler at the Berghof in Berchtesgaden on 4 April. On 23 March 1944, he was made Inspector of Night Fighters and he would stay in this post as Oberst until the end of the war. In consequence of this appointment, command of NJG 1 was given to Oberstleutnant Hans-Joachim Jabs. On 11 November, Reichsmarschall (Marshal of the Realm) Hermann Göring, in his role as commander-in-chief of the Luftwaffe, organized a meeting of high-ranking Luftwaffe officers, including Streib. The meeting, also referred to as the "Areopag" was held at the Luftkriegsakademie (air war academy) at Berlin-Gatow. This Luftwaffe version of the Greek Areopagus—a court of justice—aimed at finding solutions to the deteriorating air war situation over Germany.

Often called 'Father of the Nachtjagd''' Streib helped develop the operational tactics used by the Nachtjagd during the early to mid-war years, and along with the likes of Falck made the Luftwaffes night fighter force an effective fighting force against the RAF Bomber Command offensive. He is mentioned in the book Almost a Lifetime by John McMahon when he shot down John's Lancaster, killing all but John.

Later life
After the war he worked in the grocery business before joining the Bundeswehr on 16 March 1956. Streib was asked to testify in the aftermaths of the 1961 F-84 Thunderstreak incident. For three years he commanded the pilot school A in Landsberg am Lech, equipped with the T-6 Texan. He was responsible for training the beginner pilots in the German Air Force. Brigadegeneral Streib's military career ended with his retirement on 31 March 1966. His last position was Inspizient Fliegende Verbände (Inspector of Flying Forces). He died on 15 June 1986 in Munich and was buried at the Ostfriedhof (Eastern Cemetery) in Munich with military honors.

Summary of career

Aerial victory claims
According to US historian David T. Zabecki, Streib was credited with 66 aerial victories. Obermaier and Scutts list Streib with 68—one daytime and 67 nighttime—aerial victories, claimed in about 150 combat missions. Spick also states that Streib was credited with 66 aerial victories, including one by day. Foreman, Parry and Mathews, authors of Luftwaffe Night Fighter Claims 1939 – 1945, researched the German Federal Archives and found records for 67 nocturnal victory claims. Mathews and Foreman also published Luftwaffe Aces — Biographies and Victory Claims, listing Streib with 66 claims, including one as a Zerstörer pilot, plus two further unconfirmed claims.

Awards
 Wound Badge in Black
 Front Flying Clasp of the Luftwaffe for Night Fighters in Gold
 Combined Pilots-Observation Badge
 Iron Cross (1939)
 2nd Class (17 May 1940)
 1st Class (20 June 1940)
 German Cross in Gold on 26 February 1942 as Hauptmann in the I./Nachtjagdgeschwader 1
 Knight's Cross of the Iron Cross with Oak Leaves and Swords
 Knight's Cross on 6 October 1940 as Oberleutnant and Staffelkapitän of the 2./Nachtjagdgeschwader 1
 197th Oak Leaves on 26 February 1943 as Major and Gruppenkommandeur of the I./Nachtjagdgeschwader 1
 54th Swords on 11 March 1944 as Major and Geschwaderkommodore of Nachtjagdgeschwader'' 1

Notes

References

Citations

Bibliography

External links
 

1911 births
1986 deaths
German World War II flying aces
Brigadier generals of the German Air Force
Bundeswehr generals
Luftwaffe pilots
Recipients of the Gold German Cross
Recipients of the Knight's Cross of the Iron Cross with Oak Leaves and Swords
Burials at the Ostfriedhof (Munich)
Military personnel from Pforzheim